The Daily Basharat (Urdu: روزنامہ بشارت) is an Urdu newspaper published from Karachi with publications for Karachi, Hyderabad and Gilgit  -Pakistan. It is the oldest Urdu newspaper of Sindh in continuous publication since the last 61 years.

See also
 List of newspapers in Pakistan

References

Companies based in Karachi
Urdu-language newspapers published in Pakistan
Asian news websites
Daily newspapers published in Pakistan